Homayoun Salimi (همايون سليمی  in Persian; born 1948) is an Iranian Painter and academic, born in Tehran, Iran. He was the head of Department of Painting at Tehran University of Art in Tehran. He is one of the foremost exponents of the geometric abstract style in Iran.

Life and career
Homayoun Salimi was born in 1948, in Tehran. He received his earliest art education at the Mirak Tabrizi Conservatory and later travelled to France to further his studies. In 1978 he obtained a Diploma of Higher Education With Rocheron Prise, at the École des Beaux-Arts in Paris and in 1982 he obtained a master's degree of aesthetics and sciences of art from the Sorbonne and in 1990, he obtained his Ph.D., also in aesthetics and sciences of art, from Sorbonne.

He is currently a faculty member of the University of Tehran.

Work
Salimi and his contemporary, Habib Ayatollahi, are the only examples of artists working in geometric abstract, and is considered as one of the foremost exponents of the  geometric abstract style in Iran.

See also
 Islamic art
 Iranian art
 Islamic calligraphy
 List of Iranian artists

References

External links
Personal Website
boom gallery

1948 births
Iranian painters
University of Paris alumni
Living people
Abstract painters
Iranian contemporary artists
Academic staff of Tehran University of Art